Quercus hemisphaerica (sand laurel oak, laurel oak, Darlington oak, laurel-leaf oak) is a species of oak native to the southeastern and south-central United States. It is in the red oak section Quercus sect. Lobatae. It is often confused with and closely related to the Quercus laurifolia (swamp laurel oak) in which it differs in several key characteristics.

Description 
The acorns take 18 months to mature and are a fourth to a third covered by a saucer- to bowl-shaped cap.

Similar species 
Q. hemisphaerica resembles Quercus laurifolia (swamp laurel oak). They can be distinguished using this criteria.
When both sand laurel oak and swamp laurel oak are growing in the same area, sand laurel oak will flower about two weeks later than swamp laurel oak.
Sand laurel oak grows on dry sandy soils while swamp laurel oak grows on flood plains, river bottoms, and occasionally poorly drained upland soils.
Sand laurel oak has narrow ovate or elliptic leaves, while swamp laurel oak has rhombic or broad ovate leaves.
Sand laurel oak has an acute leaf apex and a rounded or obtuse (blunt, >90°) leaf base, while swamp laurel oak has an obtuse or rounded leaf apex and a cuneate or attenuate leaf base.
Sand laurel oak is mostly evergreen, while swamp laurel oak is mostly tardily deciduous.

Distribution and habitat
The tree can be found from Texas to Delaware.

It grows in somewhat xeric sandy soils, sand hills, and sometimes on hillsides.

Ecology
There is at least one known hybrid involving Q. hemisphaerica which is with Q. laevis (Q. × mellichampii Trel.).

References

External links
 North Carolina State Fact Sheet: Laurel Oak
 Auburn University, Trees of Alabama and the Southeast: Laurel Oak
 Virginia Tech, Department of Forestry Fact Sheet: Darlington oak
 United States Department of Agriculture plants profile: Darlington oak
 Floridata: Quercus hemisphaerica
 Institute of Food and Agricultural Sciences, University of Florida: Laurel Oak or Swamp Laurel Oak?

hemisphaerica
Trees of the Southern United States
Plants described in 1805